Ankara Radio is a nationwide radio network broadcasting from Ankara. Its first broadcast was on 6 November 1927, by a 5 kW longwave AM transmitter over 1554 meters.

History

References

See also 
 Radyo 2

Radio stations established in 1927
Radio stations in Ankara
Turkish-language radio stations
1927 establishments in Turkey
Turkish Radio and Television Corporation